Connecticut's 107th House of Representatives district elects one member of the Connecticut House of Representatives. It consists of the town of Brookfield and parts of Danbury and Bethel. It has been represented by Republican Stephen Harding since 2015.

List of representatives

Recent elections

2020

2018

2016

2015 special

2014

2012

References

107